Stolberg is a town in North Rhine-Westphalia, Germany. It has a long history as an industrial town and belongs to the district Aachen and the lower district court of Eschweiler.

Geography
Stolberg is located approximately 5 km east of Aachen in a valley at the fringes of the Eifel which begins in the East with the Hürtgenwald and in the South in the municipality of Monschau. It borders Eschweiler in the north and the Aachen city district of Eilendorf in the west.

The core of Stolberg is commonly divided into Unterstolberg (Lower Stolberg) and Oberstolberg (Upper Stolberg) which includes most of the old parts of Stolberg. Other parts of Stolberg are Atsch, Büsbach, Donnerberg, Münsterbusch. In addition the villages of Breinig, Dorff, Gressenich, Mausbach, Schevenhütte, Venwegen, Vicht, Werth, and Zweifall.

History
Stolberg is first mentioned in documents from the 12th century. It became an important centre of brass production when Protestant brass producers resettled to Stolberg from Aachen around 1600 to escape religious persecution and economic restrictions. The nickname of Stolberg, Die Kupferstadt (the Copper City), thus derives not from copper but from brass, "yellow copper". The Kupferhöfe (copper yards) where brass was originally produced and the brass manufacturers built their mansions remain as reminders of the brass manufacturers that dominated Stolberg and its economy.

Stolberg lost its importance as a brass producer when pure zinc became available in the middle of the 19th century. Many brass producers moved into other industries, especially the glass and textile industries, or specialized in the mass production of haberdashery.

Stolberg belonged to the Duchy of Jülich until 1794, when it became occupied by France and part of the Canton of Eschweiler in the Département de la Roer. After the Congress of Vienna in 1815, Stolberg became part of the Kingdom of Prussia.

Stolberg acquired notoriety in the 1960s as the residence of Contergan producer Grünenthal. Because of its heavy industry, Stolberg has become associated with diseases of metal poisoning, literally "Gressenich cadmium cattle-dying" disease and "Stolberg lead children" disease.

Stolberg has a significant ultra-right history, e.g., as the headquarters of the Wiking-Jugend from 1967 to 1991 and as a place of NPD activities.

Main sights
The town's landmark is a castle which was rebuilt at the beginning of the 20th century at the location of the former medieval castle of Stolberg. Other remarkable old buildings are the Kupferhöfe (Copper yards) and the old town in general.

At the eastern border of the territory of Stolberg is the Wehebachtalsperre (Beck Wehe reservoir) which includes a lookout point.

Transport
Although Stolberg lacks direct Autobahn access, the next autobahns are easily accessible via the neighbouring towns of Aachen and Eschweiler. Stolberg Hauptbahnhof (central station) is on the Cologne–Aachen railway and served by a Regional-Express train every half-hour. Several smaller stations in the centre of Stolberg are connected to Aachen (district) and Düren (district) by the euregiobahn, a slower regional train.

Sports
Stolberg has several football, handball, gymnastics, swimming, tennis clubs and a few traditional shooting clubs.

Other sports clubs include the gliding club Luftsportverein Stolberg, situated at the Diepenlinchen Airfield and the regionally successful artistic cycling club RSC Münsterbusch.

Twin towns – sister cities

Stolberg (Rhineland) is twinned with:
 Faches-Thumesnil, France (1989)
 Stolberg (Südharz), Germany (1990)
 Valognes, France (1990/1991)

Notable people
Heinz Bennent (1921–2011), actor
Viktor Holtz (1846–1919), educator
LaFee (born 1990), singer
Margitta Mazzocchi, politician in West Virginia
Anton Resch (1921–1975), fighter pilot

See also
Stolberg (Harz), Saxony-Anhalt, Germany 
Stollberg

References

Further reading

External links

 

 
Aachen (district)